The 2021–22 Nemzeti Bajnokság I (known as the K&H férfi kézilabda liga for sponsorship reasons) was the 71st season of the Nemzeti Bajnokság I, the top men's handball league in Hungary. A total of fourteen teams contest this season's league, which began on 27 August 2021 and will conclude in 11 June 2022.

Pick Szeged won their fifth title.

Teams

Team changes

Arenas and locations
The following 14 clubs compete in the Nemzeti Bajnokság I during the 2021–22 season:

Personnel and kits
All teams are obligated to have the logo of the Hungarian national sports betting brand Tippmix sponsors since 2015, their logo is therefore present on all team kits.

Managerial changes

Format
The competition format for the 2021–22 season consists of 14 teams each playing a total of 26 matches, half at home and half away,
After the Regular season, the championship result will be determined in 3-14. placed ranking teams. The teams finishing in 13th and 14th place will be eliminated in the Nemzeti Bajnokság I/B. 1st and 2nd place in the Regular season will play a rematch based championship final. The career choice for the first match of the final is 2nd place in the regular season.

Regular season

Standings

Schedule and results
In the table below the home teams are listed on the left and the away teams along the top.

Finals

|}

Game 1

Game 2

58–58 on aggregate. Pick Szeged won the Finals on away goals.

Season statistics

Top goalscorers

Number of teams by counties and regions

Hungarian clubs in European competitions

See also
 2021–22 Magyar Kupa
 2021–22 Nemzeti Bajnokság I/B
 2021–22 Nemzeti Bajnokság II

References

External links
 Hungarian Handball Federaration 

Nemzeti Bajnokság I (men's handball)
Hungary
Nemzeti Bajnoksag I Men